The qualification for the 2013 Men's European Volleyball Championship was held from May 12, 2012 to May 26, 2013. Nine teams qualified for the 2013 Men's European Volleyball Championship tournament, namely the six group winners of the Second Round, together with the three winners of the Third Round.

First round
Dates: May 12–20, 2012
All times are local.
In case of a 1–1 tie, teams played a Golden Set to determine the winner.

|}

First leg

|}

Second leg

|}

Second round
The six group winners qualified directly for the 2013 Men's European Volleyball Championship, while the six runners-up will moved on to the Third Round where three more teams qualified.

All times are local.

Pool A

|}

Tournament 1
The tournament was held at Pavilhao de Desportos in Vila do Conde, Portugal.

|}

Tournament 2
The tournament was held at Başkent Volleyball Hall in Ankara, Turkey.

|}

Pool B

|}

Tournament 1
The tournament was held at Sportcampus Lange Munte in Kortrijk, Belgium.

|}

Tournament 2
The tournament was held at Kalev Sports Hall in Tallinn, Estonia.

|}

Pool C

|}

Tournament 1
The tournament was held at Budocenter in Vienna, Austria.

|}

Tournament 2
The tournament was held at Sport Hall Sareza in  Ostrava, Czech Republic.

|}

Pool D

|}

Tournament 1
The tournament was held at Municipal Sports Hall Trikala in Trikala, Greece.

|}

Tournament 2
The tournament was held at Energia Areena in Vantaa, Finland.

|}

Pool E

|}

Tournament 1
The tournament was held at Palace of Sports in Kharkiv, Ukraine.

|}

Tournament 2
The tournament was held at Ljudski vrt Sports Hall in  Maribor, Slovenia.

|}

Pool F

|}

Tournament 1
The tournament was held at Városi Sportcsarnok in Szeged, Hungary.

|}

Tournament 2
The tournament was held at Zemgales Olympic Center in Jelgava, Latvia.

|}

Third round
Dates: May 31 – June 9, 2013
All times are local.
In case of a 1–1 tie, teams played a Golden Set to determine the winner.

|}
1 Belgium won the golden set 15–12.
2 Turkey won the golden set 15–10

First leg

|}

Second leg

|}

External links
Official website

Q
2012 in volleyball
2013 in volleyball
Qualification for volleyball competitions